Panik may refer to:

Places
Panik, Armenia
Panik, Iğdır, Turkey
Panik, Bileća, Bosnia and Herzegovina
Panik, Vologda Oblast, Russia

Other uses
 Panik, one quarter of the production group Molemen.
Panik (band)
 Panik (film), a 1928 German film directed by and starring Harry Piel
 Joe Panik, American baseball player
 Richard Pánik, Slovak ice hockey player